Kenneth James McGown (22 March 1936 – 16 December 2010) was an Australian rules footballer who played with Richmond in the Victorian Football League (VFL).

Notes

External links 

1936 births
2010 deaths
Australian rules footballers from Victoria (Australia)		
Richmond Football Club players